Artur Igorevich Rylov (born 12 April 1989) is a Russian former footballer.

External links
  Player page on the official FC Moscow website
 

1989 births
People from Vologda
Living people
Russian footballers
Russia youth international footballers
Association football midfielders
FC Moscow players
Russian Premier League players
PFC Krylia Sovetov Samara players
PFC Spartak Nalchik players
FC Torpedo Moscow players
FC Rotor Volgograd players
FC Shinnik Yaroslavl players
FC Fakel Voronezh players
FC SKA-Khabarovsk players
Footballers from Vologda